Vacationer usually refers to the noun derived from the term "vacation". It may also refer to the following:

Automobiles 
The "Vacationer" name has been applied to several special edition variants of Holden automobiles:

 Holden Camira
 JE Vacationer, introduced in late 1987
 Holden Commodore:
 VC Vacationer, introduced in November 1980
 VH Vacationer, introduced in November 1981, October 1982, April 1983 and November 1983
 VK Vacationer, introduced in September 1984 and October 1985
 VL Vacationer, introduced in September 1987
 VN Vacationer, introduced in October 1990
 VP Vacationer, introduced in November 1992
 VS Vacationer, introduced in September 1995
 Holden Kingswood:
 HQ Vacationer, introduced in October 1973
 HJ Vacationer II, introduced in November 1975
 HZ Kingswood SL Vacationer, introduced in October 1978

Other 
 Vacationer (train), a passenger train operated by Amtrak
 Vacationer (band), an American band